Zealandia is a genus of ferns in the family Polypodiaceae, subfamily Microsoroideae, erected in 2019. , the genus was not accepted by some sources.

Taxonomy
The division of the subfamily Microsoroideae into genera has long been uncertain. A 2019 molecular phylogenetic study suggested that there were three clades close to Lecanopteris sensu stricto and distinct from other clades in the subfamily. The authors of the study preferred to set up three extra monophyletic genera, rather than use a broader circumscription of Lecanopteris. The genera are related as shown in the following cladogram.

, the Checklist of Ferns and Lycophytes of the World recognized the segregate genera, including Zealandia; other sources did not.

Species
, the Checklist of Ferns and Lycophytes of the World recognized the following species:
Zealandia novae-zealandiae (Baker) Testo & A.R.Field
Zealandia powellii (Baker) Testo & A.R.Field
Zealandia pustulata (G.Forst.) Testo & A.R.Field
Zealandia vieillardii (Mett.) Testo & A.R.Field

References

Polypodiaceae
Fern genera